Agnes Smyth Baden-Powell (16 December 1858 – 2 June 1945) was the younger sister of Robert Baden-Powell, 1st Baron Baden-Powell, and was most noted for her work in establishing the Girl Guide movement as a female counterpart to her older brother's Scouting Movement.

Early life
Agnes was the thirteenth of fourteen children of her father, the Reverend Baden Powell, who had married twice previously. He was the Savilian Professor of Geometry at the University of Oxford from 1827 to 1860. She was his third daughter, but the elder two had died before Agnes was born; she was her mother's only daughter.

Her mother, the third wife of Baden Powell (the previous two having died) was a gifted musician and artist, was Henrietta Grace Smyth, the elder daughter of Admiral William Henry Smyth and his wife Annarella.   

Apart from Robert already mentioned above, among Agnes's brothers were Warington Baden-Powell, Sir George Baden-Powell, Frank Baden-Powell, and Baden Baden-Powell. She had four brothers. 

When Agnes was only two years of age, the Reverend Baden Powell died. To honour him after his death, Agnes's mother Henrietta added Baden to their surname and that branch of the family has since been known as Baden-Powell.

Baden's death left the family under the firm control of Henrietta, who was determined to instill in her children a desire to succeed. Agnes' brother, Robert, has been quoted as saying, "The whole secret of my getting on lay with my mother."

Agnes went on to become an accomplished musician, playing the organ, piano and violin. Her varied interests included natural history and astronomy, and she kept bees, birds and butterflies in her home. 

In April 1901, Agnes became engaged to Sir William Bisset Berry, the Speaker of the South African Parliament, but they did not marry.  

With her brother Baden Fletcher Smyth Baden-Powell, Agnes made aeronautical balloons, working the silk for the envelope, and they made many flights together. Later she helped him with aeroplane-building. Agnes was an honorary companion of the Royal Aeronautical Society from 1938.

She was for some years president of the Westminster Division of the Red Cross, and worked for the League of Mercy and for Queen Mary's Needlework Guild.

Guide movement
Following the creation of the Boy Scout Association, Robert Baden-Powell organised a gathering of Scouts at the Crystal Palace in London in 1909. Amongst the many thousands of Boy Scouts gathered, there were several hundred girls present, registered as Scouts, and also a small group of girls, dressed in Scout uniforms, who had arrived late and gate-crashed the event without tickets - but they got the publicity.  

Popular opinion at this time was against mixed activities for girls, and growing pressure persuaded Robert Baden-Powell to consider setting up a separate organisation for the Girl Scouts, and having been turned down by first aid societies, he approached his sister, Agnes, who reluctantly agreed to take on the organising of the new sister group, Girl Guides.  Agnes Baden-Powell's character was useful in counteracting negative opinions of the new Girl Guides. A friend wrote of her:

Anyone who had come into touch with her gentle influence, her interest in all womanly arts, and her love of birds, insects, and flowers, would scoff at the idea of her being the president of a sort of Amazon Cadet Corps.

In late 1909, Robert Baden-Powell published "Pamphlet A: Baden-Powell Girl Guides, a Suggestion for Character Training for Girls" and "Pamphlet B: Baden-Powell Girl Guides, a Suggestion for Character Training for Girls". These were precursors to the handbook.

In 1910 the Girl Guide Association was created, with Agnes as President. By April 1910 there were 6,000 young girls registered as Girl Guides. In 1912, Agnes brought about the formation of the 1st Lone Company and was the de facto president of The Girl Guide Association.

During this time, Agnes wrote the Guides' first handbook. This was The Handbook for the Girl Guides or How Girls Can Help to Build Up the Empire, and published in 1912, it was a reworking of the Scouting for Boys book written by Robert several years earlier but with chapters added by Agnes on a number of subjects. The Girl Guide movement was given official recognition in 1915.  In early 1916 Agnes's young sister-in-law Olave Baden-Powell was appointed Sussex County Commissioner, and in September 1916 the new County Commissioners voted Olave into the new post of Chief Guide, putting her in charge of Guiding. Agnes was offered the honorary post of President which she reluctantly accepted.

In 1917, following pressure, Agnes resigned from the presidency in favour of Princess Mary, who was also a keen supporter of the Girl Guides, and Agnes became Vice-President.

Agnes continued as Vice-President until her death on 2 June 1945 in North East Surrey.  She was buried in the family grave in Kensal Green Cemetery in London, though her name was not listed on the monument.

References

External links
 
 

Chief Guides
Girlguiding officials
Scouting pioneers
British beekeepers
1858 births
1945 deaths
Agnes
Women beekeepers